Nicetas II Mountanes, (? – after 1189) was Ecumenical Patriarch of Constantinople from February 1186 to February 1189. He was appointed by the Byzantine emperor Isaac II Angelos.

References

Bibliography 
 
 
 

12th-century births
12th-century deaths
12th-century patriarchs of Constantinople